Dêqên County, or Deqin County, is under the administration of Dêqên Tibetan Autonomous Prefecture, located in the northwest of Yunnan province, China.

Geography and climate

It is located in the central part of the Hengduan Mountains, and contains the valleys of the Salween, Mekong, and Jinsha Rivers.

The town is nonetheless a little warmer during the winter than Shangri-La County to the east despite being slightly higher in elevation, due to its more southerly aspect. With monthly percent possible sunshine ranging from 29% in July to 62% in December, the county seat receives 1,989 hours of bright sunshine annually, with autumn and winter sunnier than spring and summer.

Administrative divisions
Dêqên County has 2 towns, 4 townships and 2 ethnic townships. 
2 towns
 Shengping
 Benzilan
4 townships

2 ethnic townships
 Tuoding Lisu
 Xiaruo Lisu

Demographics
There are many Tibetans who live in Dêqên  and they, compared to Tibetans in Tibet, have had longer-lasting trade relations with Han-Chinese and other ethnic minorities.

Composition
Meilishi is in Foshan Township, in the northernmost part of the county.

Transportation
China National Highway 214

Deqin can be reached by many daily buses traveling North from Kunming - Dali - Lijiang - Zhongdian - Deqin.

The route is a very scenic and most of it is a newly built highway apart from the Zhongdian to Deqin section which is a winding mountain road through the scenic North Yunnan/Tibetan mountains.

See also
Bamê, a village in Foshan, Dêqên County
Meili Xue Shan (Chinese translation: "Mainri snowy range") or Mainri Snow Mountains.

References
 Galipeau, Brendan A. "Socio-Ecological Vulnerability in a Tibetan Village on the Lancang River, China" (Archive) (master's thesis). Oregon State University. July 6, 2012.

Reference notes

External links

Deqin County Official Website

 
County-level divisions of Dêqên Tibetan Autonomous Prefecture